The 1975 Japan rugby union tour of Australia was a series of nine matches played by the Japan national rugby union team in Australia in July and August 1975. The Japan team won four of their matches and lost the other five, including both internationals against the Australia national rugby union team.

Matches

References

Japan rugby union tour
Japan national rugby union team tours
Rugby union tours of Australia
tour
tour